Zgheib is a surname. Notable people with the surname include:

Elsa Zgheib (born 1981), Lebanese actress
Mohammad Zgheib, Lebanese officer
Paul Zgheib (born 1977), Lebanese photographer